Elian was a saint who founded a church in North Wales around the year 450. The parish of Llanelian-yn-Rhos in Conwy County Borough is named after him. The legend of St. Elian says he was related to Isfael (another Welsh saint) and laboured in the missions of Cornwall, England. His feast day is 13 January.

Tradition holds that he came by sea from Rome and landed in Anglesey at Porth yr Yehen, where he built his church. One folk tale says he forbade the keeping of greyhounds after one killed or disturbed a doe in his care.

Llanelian Road in Colwyn Bay, North Wales, is named after him. His connection with Eglwysilan near Caerphilly is unclear.

References

Medieval Welsh saints
5th-century establishments
Conwy County Borough
Anglesey
Rhos-on-Sea